The Chemical Society was a scientific society formed in 1841 (then named the Chemical Society of London) by 77 scientists as a result of increased interest in scientific matters. Chemist Robert Warington was the driving force behind its creation.

History
One of the aims of the Chemical Society was to hold meetings for "the communication and discussion of discoveries and observations, an account of which shall be published by the Society". In 1847, its importance was recognised by a Royal Charter, which added to its role in the advancement of science, the development of chemical applications in industry. Its members included eminent chemists from overseas including August Wilhelm von Hofmann, who became its president in 1861. Membership was open to all those interested in chemistry, but fellowship was for long restricted to men.

In 1904, Edith Humphrey, thought to be the first British woman to gain a doctorate in chemistry (at the University of Zurich), was one of nineteen women chemists to petition the Chemical Society for admission of women to fellowship. This was eventually granted in 1919, and Humphrey was subsequently elected to fellowship.

The Chemical Society of London succeeded where a number of previous chemical associations - the Lunar Society's London branch chemical society of the 1780s, the Animal Chemical Club of 1805, the London Chemical Society of 1824 - failed. One assertion of a cause of success of the Chemical Society of London is that it was, unlike its forerunners, a "fruitful amalgamation of the technological and academic chemist".

Its activities expanded over the years, including eventually becoming a major publisher in the field of chemistry. On 15 May 1980, it amalgamated with the Royal Institute of Chemistry, the Faraday Society and the Society for Analytical Chemistry to become the Royal Society of Chemistry.

Presidents 

 Thomas Graham: 1841–1843
 Arthur Aikin: 1843–1845
 Thomas Graham: 1845–1847
 William Thomas Brande: 1847–1849
 Richard Phillips: 1849–1851
 Charles Daubeny: 1851–1853
 Colonel Philip Yorke: 1853–1855
 William Allen Miller: 1855–1857
 Sir Lyon Playfair: 1857–1859
 Sir Benjamin Brodie: 1859–1861
 August Wilhelm von Hofmann: 1861–1863
 Alexander William Williamson: 1863–1865
 William Allen Miller: 1865–1867
 Warren de la Rue: 1867–1869
 Alexander William Williamson: 1869–1871
 Sir Edward Frankland: 1871–1873
 William Odling: 1873–1875
 Sir Frederick Augustus Abel: 1875–1877
 John Hall Gladstone: 1877–1878
 Warren de la Rue: 1879–1880
 Sir Henry Enfield Roscoe: 1880–1882
 Sir Joseph Henry Gilbert: 1882–1883
 William Henry Perkin: 1883–1885
 : 1885–1887
 Sir William Crookes: 1887–1889
 William James Russell: 1889–1891
 Alexander Crum Brown: 1891–1893
 Henry Edward Armstrong: 1893–1895
 Augustus George Vernon Harcourt: 1895–1897
 Sir James Dewar: 1897–1899
 Sir Thomas Edward Thorpe: 1899–1901
 James Emerson Reynolds: 1901–1903
 William Augustus Tilden: 1903–1905
 Raphael Meldola: 1905–1907
 Sir William Ramsay: 1907–1909
 Harold Baily Dixon: 1909–1911
 Percy Faraday Frankland: 1911–1913
 Sir William Henry Perkin Jnr: 1913–1915

 Alexander Scott: 1915–1917
 Sir William Jackson Pope: 1917–1919
 James Johnston Dobbie: 1919–1921
 Sir James Walker: 1921–1923
 : 1923–1925
 : 1925–1926
 Herbert Brereton Baker: 1926–1928
 Sir Jocelyn Field Thorpe: 1928–1931
 George Gerald Henderson: 1931–1933
 Sir : 1933–1935
 Nevil Vincent Sidgwick: 1935–1937
 Sir Frederick George Donnan: 1937–1939
 Sir Robert Robinson: 1939–1941
 James Charles Philip: 1941 to August 1941
 William Hobson Mills: 1941–1944
 Walter Norman Haworth: 1944–1946
 Sir Cyril Norman Hinshelwood: 1946–1948
 Sir Ian Morris Heilbron: 1948–1950
 Sir Eric Keightley Rideal: 1950–1952
 Sir Christopher Kelk Ingold: 1952–1954
 : 1954–1956
 Sir Edmund Langley Hirst: 1956–1958
 Harry Julius Emeleus: 1958–1960
 Lord Alexander Robertus Todd: 1960–1962
 John Monteath Robertson: 1962–1964
 Sir Ewart Ray Herbert Jones: 1964–1966
 Sir Harry Work Melville: 1966–1968
 Sir Ronald Sydney Nyholm: 1968–1970
 Lord George Porter: 1970–1972
 Sir Frederick Sydney Dainton: 1972–1973
 Sir Derek Harold Richard Barton: 1973–1974
 Jack Wheeler Barrett: 1974–1975
 Frank Arnold Robinson: 1975–1976
 Cyril Clifford Addison: 1976–1977
 : 1977–1978
 Theodore Morris Sugden: 1978–1979
 Dr Alfred Spinks: 1979–1980

Original members

On 23 February 1841, a meeting was convened to take into consideration the formation of a Chemical Society. The Provisional Committee appointed for carrying that object into effect invited a number of gentlemen engaged in the practice and pursuit of chemistry to become original members. The following 77 communicated their written assent:

Arthur Aikin
Thomas Andrews
J A Barron
James Blake
William Blythe
William Thomas Brande
E W Brayley
Henry James Brooke
Charles Button
Thomas Clark
William John Cock
John Thomas Cooper
John Thomas Cooper Jnr.
Andrew Crosse
Walter Crum
James Cumming
John Frederic Daniell
Charles Daubeny
Edmund Davy
Warren De la Rue
Thomas Everitt
William Ferguson
George Fownes
A Frampton
J P Gassiot
Thomas Gill

Thomas Graham
John Graham
John Joseph Griffin
Thomas Griffiths
William Robert Grove
Charles Heisch
Henry Hennell
Thomas Hetherington Henry
William Herapath
Thomas Charles Hope
F R Hughes
Percival Johnson
James Johnston
W B Leeson
George Dixon Longstaff
George Lowe
Robert Macgregor
Charles Macintosh
John Mercer
William Hallowes Miller
Thomas Moody
David Mushet
J A Paris
H L Pattinson
Thomas Pearsall
Frederic Penny

William Haseldine Pepys
Richard Phillips
Lyon Playfair
Robert Porrett
L H Potts
G Owen Rees
David Boswell Reid
Thomas Richardson
Maurice Scanlan
Ollive Sims
Denham Smith
Edward Solly Jnr
John Stenhouse
Richard Taylor
John Tennent
E F Teschemacher
Thomas Thomson
Robert Dundas Thomson
Wilton George Turner
Robert Warington
William West
James Low Wheeler
George Wilson
John Wilson
Philip Yorke

See also
Journal of the Chemical Society
Proceedings of the Chemical Society
Chemical Society Reviews

References

History of Royal Society of Chemistry and the former societies

History of chemistry
Royal Society of Chemistry
Defunct learned societies of the United Kingdom
1841 establishments in the United Kingdom
Defunct professional associations based in the United Kingdom
Scientific organizations established in 1841
Organizations disestablished in 1980
1980 disestablishments in the United Kingdom